Neomariania scriptella is a moth in the Stathmopodidae family. It was described by Rebel in 1940. It is found on the Azores.

References

Moths described in 1940
Stathmopodidae
Taxa named by Hans Rebel